The Kaktovik Numerals are a Unicode block for the Kaktovik numerals, a base-20 system of numerical digits created by Alaskan Iñupiat. It was first encoded in Unicode version 15 in 2022. It contains 20 characters for representing each of the digits 0-19 in the base-20 place value numeral system of Iñupiaq and related Inuit, Yupik, and Unangan languages.

History 
The following Unicode-related documents record the purpose and process of defining specific characters in the Kaktovik Numerals block:

Unicode blocks